István Náday (20 June 1888 – 30 January 1954) was a Hungarian military officer, who served as commander of the Hungarian First Army during the Second World War. He was appointed an infantry lieutenant at the Ludovika Academy in 1908, and served in the Red Army in the First World War. After the war, he was a military academy professor, and worked his way up to general, then eventually commander-in-chief.

References

 Náday István - Magyar Életrajzi Lexikon

1888 births
1954 deaths
Hungarian soldiers
Austro-Hungarian military personnel of World War I
Austro-Hungarian generals
Hungarian military personnel of World War II